Bouteloua dactyloides, commonly known as buffalograss or a buffalo grass, is a North American prairie grass native to Canada, Mexico, and the United States. It is a shortgrass found mainly on the High Plains and is co-dominant with blue grama (B. gracilis) over most of the shortgrass prairie.

Buffalo grass in North America is not the same species of grass commonly known as "buffalo" in Australia.  It should not be confused with Stenotaphrum secundatum varieties such as 'Sir Walter' or 'Palmetto'.

Description
Buffalograss is a warm-season perennial shortgrass. It is drought-, heat-, and cold-resistant. Buffalograss is usually dioecious, but sometimes monoecious or with perfect flowers. The male inflorescence is a panicle; the female inflorescence consists of short spikelets borne in burlike clusters, usually with two to four spikelets per bur.

Buffalograss sends out numerous, branching stolons; occasionally, it also produces rhizomes. Roots are also numerous and thoroughly occupy the soil. The numerous stolons and roots form a dense sod.

Range
Buffalograss is common and widespread across most of the Great Plains and in scattered locations in neighboring regions, from the Canadian Prairie Provinces to central Mexico, as well as the Mississippi Valley and the Intermountain Region.

In Australia B. dactyloides is not called buffalograss, but is referred to as 'prairie grass'.

Taxonomy
Bouteloua dactyloides was initially placed by Thomas Nuttall in the genus Sesleria. It was later moved to the monotypic genus Buchloe. In 1999, James Travis Columbus moved buffalograss to Bouteloua, which also contains the grama grasses.

Uses

Lawn and garden
Buffalograss is used as a drought-tolerant turfgrass in North America and is also grown for forage. Turfgrass cultivars include '609', 'Prairie', 'Stampede', and 'Density', while 'Comanche' and 'Texoka' are intended for forage. In addition, researchers at the University of California Riverside and University of California Davis have hybridized a buffalograss cultivar, 'UC Verde', creating a thick, green, drought-tolerant lawn for California's hot, dry summers.
Agricultural scientist at University of Nebraska developed Legacy as a turf grass variety.
Buffalo grass can be established from seeded cultivars, such as Cody, Bowie and Sundancer, or from vegetative cultivars like Legacy and Prestige.

Building
Settlers used its dense sod to build sod houses.

Diseases
Buffalograss false smut is a fungal disease caused by Porocercospora seminalis (formerly placed in the genus Cercospora). Infection by the fungus prevents normal caryopsis development, resulting in loss of yield and reduced seed germination.

References

Further reading
 .
 .

External links

 Turf-Type Buchloe dactyloides at Native Turf Group (nonprofit)
 photo of herbarium specimen at Missouri Botanical Garden collected in Texas in 1846

dactyloides
Grasses of North America
Warm-season grasses of North America
Grasses of Mexico
Grasses of the United States
Native grasses of the Great Plains region
Plants described in 1818
Non-food crops
Garden plants of North America
Drought-tolerant plants
Lawn grasses